Rocky Mountain Holiday is a television special and a soundtrack album of songs from the special, performed by American singer-songwriter John Denver and The Muppets. The show has Denver playing host to the extended Muppet family; he takes them up into the scenic Rockies for an excursion that includes fishing, hiking, and camping. The soundtrack album was released in November 1982, and the special itself aired May 12, 1983, on ABC. In 1984, the album was nominated for a Grammy Award for Best Album for Children, but lost to Michael Jackson's E.T. the Extra-Terrestrial storybook.

Album track listing

Side one 
 "Hey Old Pal" – John Denver, Kermit the Frog, Fozzie Bear, and the Cast
 "Grandma’s Feather Bed" – Kermit the Frog and the Cast
 "She'll Be Coming 'Round the Mountain" – Kermit the Frog, Janice, Sgt. Floyd Pepper, Scooter, Gonzo the Great, Miss Piggy, and the Cast
 "Catch Another Butterfly" – John Denver
 "Down by the Old Mill Stream" John Denver and the Cast
 "Durango Mountain Caballero" – John Denver
 "Gone Fishin’" - John Denver and Floyd Pepper

Side two 
 "Medley: Tumbling Tumbleweeds; Happy Trails" – John Denver and Miss Piggy
 "Poems, Prayers and Promises"- John Denver and the Cast
 "Take 'em Away" – The Jug Band
 "Going Camping" – John Denver and the Cast
 "Home on the Range" – John Denver and Rowlf the Dog
 "No One Like You" – John Denver

Plot
John Denver takes the Muppets camping.

Cast
 John Denver as himself
The Muppet performers
 Jim Henson as Kermit the Frog, Rowlf the Dog, Waldorf, and Zeke
 Frank Oz as Miss Piggy, Fozzie Bear, Animal, and Gramps
 Jerry Nelson as Floyd Pepper, Robin the Frog, Camilla the Chicken, and Slim Wilson
 Richard Hunt as Scooter, Janice, Statler, and Bubba
 Dave Goelz as Gonzo the Great, Zoot, and Lubbock Lou
 Steve Whitmire as Rizzo the Rat and the Giant Man-Eating Chicken
 Kathryn Mullen
 Karen Prell

Home video
Rocky Mountain Holiday was released by Sony Pictures Entertainment's Columbia TriStar Home Entertainment division on VHS and DVD on August 26, 2003. A scene from the original broadcast in which Denver pilots a plane with Rowlf the Dog to cure the dog of his hiccups was cut for the home video release, out of respect for Denver who died in a plane crash in 1997.

References

External links
 

John Denver albums
The Muppets albums
The Muppets television specials
1983 television films
1983 films
1982 soundtrack albums
Television soundtracks
RCA Records soundtracks
Folk soundtracks
Albums produced by Milt Okun
Television shows directed by Jim Henson